Kim So-hye (born July 19, 1999), known mononymously as Sohye, is a South Korean actress and singer signed under S&P Entertainment. She is best known for finishing fifth in Mnet's K-pop girl group survival show Produce 101 and for being a member of girl group I.O.I, and her roles in Poetry Story (2017), Kang Deok-soon's Love History (2017), and Best Chicken (2019).

Early life and education
Born in Seoul, Kim So-hye was a volleyball player in junior high, and won the National Junior High Title as a libero. Kim graduated from the Gyeonggi Girls' High School.
Kim is currently attending in Sejong University with Film and Arts Major.

Career

2016: Produce 101 and I.O.I

Coming from an acting company, Kim was training to become an actress and had no experience in singing and dancing before joining Produce 101. She finished in fifth place out of the 101 girls competing and became a member of I.O.I. Her company, Redline Entertainment, maintained that she would continue her acting training once she finished promoting with the group.

2017–present: Acting activities
In June 2016, Kim created her own management label, S&P (Shark & Penguin) Entertainment. She also opened a coffee shop, Penguin's Café, in Seocho District to provide a space where she and her agency could connect with fans.

Aside from participating in activities as part of I.O.I, Kim was a regular host on MBC Every1's Star Show 360 and SBS' Game Show.

In 2017, Kim made her acting debut in the web drama Poetry Story. The same year, she was cast as the female lead in  her first television drama, Kang Deok-soon's Love History.

In 2018, Kim was cast in the youth drama Best Chicken as the female lead.

In 2019, Kim was confirmed to make her big-screen debut in the melodrama film Moonlit Winter. Film critic, film magazine expert, and reporter named "Kim Sohye" as one of 7 Best Korean Actress 2019, and Moonlit Winter as one of the Best Korean Movie of 2019. (alongside with Gong Hyojin and Park Jihoo). Kim was featured in Olltii's "Press Start" for his album 8BEAT released on September 9, 2019. Kim starred in the KBS drama How to Buy a Friend alongside Lee Shin-young in 2020.

On May 4, 2021, Kim So-hye and the members of I.O.I celebrated their 5th debut anniversary with a reunion live stream show called "Yes, I Love It!".

Discography

Singles

Filmography

Film

Television series

Web series

Television shows

Theater

Awards and nominations

Notes

References

External links 

 Kim So-hye at S&P Entertainment 
 
 
 
 

1999 births
Living people
Singers from Seoul
Actresses from Seoul
Swing Entertainment artists
I.O.I members
South Korean female idols
South Korean women pop singers
South Korean musical theatre actresses
Produce 101 contestants
21st-century South Korean actresses
21st-century South Korean singers
South Korean television actresses
South Korean web series actresses
21st-century South Korean women singers